The Monserrate Palace is a palatial villa located near Sintra, the traditional summer resort of the Portuguese court in the foothills overlooking the Atlantic Ocean north of the capital, Lisbon.

History 
According to legend, there was a chapel dedicated to Virgin Mary built by Afonso Henriques after the reconquest of Sintra (circa 1093). On its ruins another chapel dedicated to Our Lady of Monserrate was constructed on the top of the hill in 1540. The estate was then owned by Hospital Real de Todos os Santos, Lisbon. In the 17th century possession of the property was taken by the Mello e Castro family but after the 1755 Lisbon earthquake the farmhouse became unlivable.

An English merchant named Gerard de Visme rented the farm in 1789 and built a neo-Gothic house over the ruins of the chapel. In 1793-1794 the estate was subleased by William Thomas Beckford who started to design a landscaped garden. Though the property was still in ruins when Lord Byron visited in 1809, its magnificent appearance inspired the poet, who mentioned of the beauty of Monserrate in Childe Harold's Pilgrimage. After that, the property attracted foreign travelers’ attention. One of them was Francis Cook, a wealthy English merchant who subleased the estate in 1856 and was graced with the title of Viscount of Monserrate by King D. Louis. Cook purchased the property in 1863 and started to work with the architect James Knowles on the remains of the house built by de Visme. The Palace became the summer residence of the Cook family.

The design was influenced by Romanticism and Mudéjar Moorish Revival architecture with neo-Gothic elements. The eclecticism is a fine example of the Sintra Romanticism, along with other nearby palácios, such as the Pena Palace and the Quinta do Relógio. The Islamic architectural influence is in reference to when the region was a part of the wider Muslim Gharb Al-Andalus until the 13th century.

The property and hunting grounds were acquired by the Portuguese state in 1949. In 1978 the Park and Palace of Monserrate were categorized as a building of public interest. In 1995 Sintra Hills, including the Park of Monserrate, was defined as a World Heritage Cultural Landscape by UNESCO. The management of the Park of Monserrate was taken over by the Sintra Park in 2000 and its recovery and restoration program enabled the Palace to re-open to the public. In 2013 the Park of Monserrate was honored with European Garden Award under the category of “Best Development of a Historic Park or Garden”.

Park 
The terrace leads out into the large park. It is designed in a romantic style with a lake, several springs and fountains, grottoes, and is surrounded by lush greenery with rare species.

The garden is full of plants organized according to geographical areas. There are naturally grown regional strawberry and holly bushes, cork oaks; araucaria and palm trees, tree ferns from Australia and New Zealand; and agaves and yuccas from Mexico. There are camellias, azaleas, rhododendrons, bamboos as well representing Japan.

Farmyard 
The Farmyard of Monserrate covers an area around 2 hectares including native trees and a water line. It is like a small farm with various types of plants and fields for livestock. The farmyard has a renewable energy system, so it is entirely self-sufficient in terms of energy.

The former house built in 19th century was restored and furnished with equipment for educational activities, or kitchen workshops. There are orchard and vegetable patches, are of wild plants and berries, as well as cereals and aromatic plants in the farmyard. Plantation area is surrounded with the fields of horses, donkeys and sheep, besides a rabbit hutch, and a poultry coop. There is also a picnic area, an open-air amphitheater and a barn.

The stream runs through the farmyard and takes its water supply from natural springs of Monserrate Hunting Grounds. The stream has also been restored, and now amphibians and water animals get benefit of it.

Totem 
The sculpture has 7.5 metres height and was made of the trunk of a fifty years old eucalyptus tree with a  chainsaw. The tree had no chance to survive due to serious infestation by wood-decay fungus, therefore with an intervention it was kept instead of being cut. The tree was made the object of specific natural values of Sintra Mountains.

The totem of the farmyard of Monserrate was created by a Welsh artist (Nansi Hemming) who is experienced at wood sculpturing. The natural values portrayed on the totem are: Bonelli's eagle; Lesser horseshoe bat; Stage beetle; Badger; Egyptian mongoose; Lataste's viper; Mottled owl; Eurasian eagle owl; Fire salamander; Tarantula hawk; Marsh fritillary; Genet; and relict forest of Oak, Arbutus, European Holly and Ivy-leaved-fern.

The Off-Grid Farmyard 
Renewable energy project “Off-Grid Farmyard” is implemented at the Farmyard of Monserrate in order to produce electricity to meet the consumption of the Farmyard. Renewable energy is produced through 3 different sources in the Farmyard: wind power – with an air generator; hydro power – with a hydro-turbine; solar power – with a set of photovoltaic panels.

Infrastructure and equipment for “Off-grid Farmyard” was installed in 2012 under the framework of BIO+Sintra project financed by LIFE Program of the European Commission and run by Sintra Park – Monte da Lua.

Images

See also 
 List of national monuments of Portugal

References

External links 

  Parques de Sintra | Monserrate Palace

Palaces in Lisbon District
Historic house museums in Portugal
Museums in Lisbon District
Palaces in Portugal
Buildings and structures in Sintra
Residential buildings completed in 1865